Danger Within (American title: Breakout) is a 1959 British war film set in a prisoner of war camp in Northern Italy during the summer of 1943. A combination of POW escape drama and whodunit, the movie is based upon the 1952 novel Death in Captivity by Michael Gilbert, who had been a prisoner of war held by the Italians at PG 49 in Fontanellato.

Plot
A cleverly planned escape attempt, which seemed guaranteed to work, ends in disaster. Within seconds of leaving the POW camp, the would-be escapee is caught and killed by the sadistic Capitano Benucci (Peter Arne). The incident is witnessed by the other prisoners, who notice that Benucci seemed to be waiting for the escapee to arrive before shooting him dead in cold blood.

Afterwards, the escape committee, led by Lieutenant Colonel David Baird (Richard Todd), is convinced that there is an informer within their ranks. The prime suspect is a Greek officer, Lieutenant Coutoules (Cyril Shaps). However, when Coutoules is found dead in an escape tunnel, suspicions that there is a traitor living among the POWs die down. In an effort to explain away his death to the Italian captors, Coutoules' body is placed in an abandoned escape tunnel within the camp and the Italians are informed he was suffocated by a roof fall.

Based on fingerprint evidence, Benucci charges Captain Roger Byfold (Donald Houston) with the murder of Coutoules. It is obvious to the POWs that, although Byfold is completely innocent, Benucci will ensure he is found guilty and executed. The escape committee develops a desperate plan to get Byfold and two other officers (played by Peter Jones and Michael Wilding) out of the camp before Byfold goes on trial. The three POWs scale the camp fence with a ladder constructed from two rugby posts. However, Benucci and his men are concealed just outside the fence with a machine gun mounted on the back of a truck, and the escapees are promptly mown down. It is the second time Benucci has deliberately killed escaping POWs in cold blood, even though it would have been easy to capture them alive.

The escape committee realises that Benucci knew when and where the three POWs planned to escape and had positioned himself in the best place to ambush them. The only logical explanation is that there really is a traitor among the POWs, who has betrayed them by passing information to Benucci. That also means that Benucci must already know about another tunnel they are working on, intended for a mass escape of POWs. The prisoners realise that Benucci could easily intervene to prevent the next escape attempt from taking place, if he wanted to. They assume that Benucci prefers to let preparations continue so the informer can tell him the date and time of the escape, allowing Benucci to wait at the other end of the tunnel to machine-gun as many POWs as he can.

The race is on to find the informer, and for the rest of the inmates to escape en masse before the camp is handed over to the Nazis, following the Italian Armistice. The escape plan, devised by Lieutenant Colonel Huxley (Bernard Lee), is for the prisoners to make their escape during the day, under the cover of a production of Hamlet in the theatre hut by a group of POWs led by Captain Rupert Callender (Dennis Price). They assume that Benucci would never expect the POWs would try to escape in broad daylight.

Cast
 Richard Todd as Lieutenant Colonel David Baird
 Bernard Lee as Lieutenant Colonel Huxley
 Michael Wilding as Major Charles Marquand
 Richard Attenborough as Captain 'Bunter' Phillips
 Dennis Price as Captain Rupert Callender
 Donald Houston as Captain Roger Byfold
 William Franklyn as Captain Tony Long
 Vincent Ball as Captain Pat Foster
 Peter Arne as Capitano Benucci
 Peter Jones as Captain Alfred Piker
 Ronnie Stevens as Lieutenant Meynell, 'The Sewer Rat' 
 Terence Alexander as Lieutenant Gibbs
 Andrew Faulds as Lieutenant Commander 'Dopey' Gibbon, R.N. 
 Steve Norbert as Lieutenant Pierre Dessin  
 Cyril Shaps as Lieutenant Cyriakos Coutoules  
 Eric Lander as Lieutenant Tim O'Brien
 John Dearth as Lieutenant Robson
 Robert Bruce as 'Doc' Simmonds, R.A.M.C.
 Harold Siddons as Captain 'Tag' Burchnall
 Ian Whittaker as 2nd Lieutenant Betts-Hanger
 Michael Caine as POW (uncredited)

Filming locations
Locations for the film were Chobham Common, Surrey and Shepperton Studios.

See also
Stalag 17 (similar war film involving an informer inside an American POW camp)

Notes
The film was retitled Breakout for the US market.

External links
 
 

1959 films
1950s action drama films
1959 drama films
British black-and-white films
British war drama films
Films directed by Don Chaffey
World War II prisoner of war films
1950s English-language films
1950s British films